Todor Babović (born May 6, 1996) is a Montenegrin footballer playing with Milton SC.

Club career 
Babović played with FK Žarkovo in the Serbian League Belgrade in 2015, and later with FK Vrčin in 2016. In 2017, he played abroad in the Serbian First League with FK Dinamo Vranje. After a season abroad he played in the Montenegrin Second League with FK Cetinje. In 2019, he played abroad for the second time in the Canadian Academy of Soccer League (CASL) with Milton SC. Later throughout the season he played in the Canadian Soccer League with SC Waterloo Region. 

In 2021, he returned to play with former team Milton SC in the CASL.

References 

1996 births
Living people
Association football forwards
Montenegrin footballers
OFK Žarkovo players
FK Dinamo Vranje players
FK Cetinje players
Milton SC players
SC Waterloo Region players
Serbian First League players
Montenegrin Second League players
Canadian Soccer League (1998–present) players
Montenegrin expatriate footballers
Expatriate soccer players in Canada
Montenegrin expatriate sportspeople in Canada